Saltrød is a village in Arendal municipality in Agder county, Norway. The village lies along the Tromøysundet strait, looking across the water towards the island of Tromøy. Stokken Church is located in Saltrød.

References

Villages in Agder
Arendal